Mama Manchu Alludu Kanchu is a 2015 Indian Telugu-language action comedy film written and directed by Srinivasa Reddy and produced by Vishnu Manchu under the 24 Frames Factory banner. It features an ensemble cast comprising Mohan Babu, Allari Naresh, Meena, Ramya Krishna, Poorna, debutante Hridaya, Ali, and Varun Sandesh. It is a remake of the Marathi film Be Dune Saade Chaar (2009) and shares continuity with the 1992 film Allari Mogudu.

The film was officially launched on 19 August 2015 and  released on 25 December 2015. The film received mixed reviews and poor ratings from the critics.

Plot
Bhaktavatsalam Naidu (Mohan Babu), who has married two women and has successfully managed to keep the secret of the other woman to both the ladies. His friend Ismail (Ali) helps him in protecting the secret. His first wife Suryakantham (Meena) has a daughter named Sruthi (Poorna) and second wife Priyamvada (Ramya Krishna) has a son Gautham Naidu (Varun Sandesh). Incidentally, the birthdays of both the boy and the girl fall on the same date and in a comedy of errors Naidu swaps the gifts. Gautham and Shruthi want to meet each other to exchange their gifts. Naidu doesn't want this to happen as his secret could be out. So, he requisitions the service of Balaraju (Allari Naresh). But Balaraju falls in love with Sruthi. The film is all about Naidu's plans to keep the secret, on one hand, to keep Balaraju away from Sruthi. Later, Naidu informs about Balaraju to his father. Actually, in Balaraju's village, there is a girl(sister of the village head) who loves Balaraju and her brother compels him to marry his sister. Naidu sends Ismail with a letter informing his father about Balraju. The girl falls in love with the first instance of Ismail. Naidu also tells Sruthi to go to Balraju house to know about Balraju. After much discussion, Sruthi accepts Balraju love. Also, balraju does not inform anything about Naidu to Sruthi. This also makes Naidu accept his love. Later series reveals why Naidu married two of them and also his wives knowing the truth.

Cast
 Mohan Babu as Bhakthavatsala Naidu
 Allari Naresh as Balaraju / Gautham
 Meena as Suryakantham
 Ramya Krishna as Priyamvada
 Poorna as Shruthi Naidu
 Hridaya
 Ali as Ismail/Bhakthavatsala Naidu
 Varun Sandesh as Goutham Naidu
 Sonia Deepti as Divya
 Krishna Bhagavan as Sanyasi Rao

Soundtrack

The audio launch of the film was held on 28 November 2015 at Hyderabad, India. The film's music is composed by Koti, Raghu Kunche and Achu Rajamani.

Track listing

References

External links
 
 Mama Manchu Alludu Kanchu censored with U/A

2015 films
Indian action comedy-drama films
2010s Telugu-language films
Films scored by Achu Rajamani
Films scored by Koti
2010s action comedy-drama films
Films scored by Raghu Kunche
Telugu remakes of Marathi films
Indian sequel films